Michele Muratori (born 13 December 1983) is a Sammarinese politician, who was a Captains Regent, serving with Nicola Selva. He took office on 1 April 2019 and its ended on 1 October 2019.

Life
He is serving as a member of the Grand and General Council. Muratori graduated in Political and Social Sciences from the University of Bologna and is a leader of the political party Socialist Democratic Left. By profession he is a public employee.

References

1983 births
People from the City of San Marino
University of Bologna alumni
Captains Regent of San Marino
Members of the Grand and General Council
Living people